Wramplingham is a village and civil parish in the English county of Norfolk.
The civil parish has an area of 3.47 square kilometres and in 2001 had a population of 110 in 44 households, increasing to a population of 115 in 51 households at the 2011 Census. For the purposes of local government, the parish falls within the district of South Norfolk.

Heritage
The village name means "Homestead/village" or "hemmed-in land", with an obscure first element that is possibly a folk-name or place-name.

The church of Wramplingham St Peter and St Paul is one of 124 existing round-tower churches in Norfolk.

Wramplingham Mill was a three-storey weatherboarded corn mill, demolished in 1945.

Bill Bryson (born 1951), a British-American writer who gained sudden popularity, lived in Wramplingham between 2003 and 2013.

References

 Ordnance Survey (1999). OS Explorer Map 237 - Norwich. .
 Office for National Statistics & Norfolk County Council (2001). Census population and household counts for unparished urban areas and all parishes. Retrieved 2 December 2005.

External links

.
Information from Genuki Norfolk on Wramplingham.
St Peter and Paul on the European Round Tower Churches website
Wramplingham Mill
Barford & Wramplingham Village Hall Website for the two villages with regularly updated event information.

Villages in Norfolk
Civil parishes in Norfolk